is a Japanese professional baseball outfielder for the Yamato Takada Club. He has also played in Nippon Professional Baseball (NPB) for the Tokyo Yakult Swallows.

External links

 NPB.com

1987 births
Living people
Baseball people from Okinawa Prefecture
Japanese baseball players
Nippon Professional Baseball outfielders
Tokyo Yakult Swallows players